Thomas Estlin Prichard (20 December 1910 – 8 August 1975)  was the Archdeacon of Maidstone from 1968 until 1972

Prichard was educated at Clifton College and Exeter College, Oxford; and ordained in 1934. After curacies in Lambeth and Ashford he was Vicar of Boxley from 1943 to 1954; and then of Thanet from 1954 to 1968.

References

1910 births
Archdeacons of Maidstone
1975 deaths
Alumni of Exeter College, Oxford
People educated at Clifton College
People from Thanet (district)
People from Boxley